Harry Butcher (15 December 1873 – 29 December 1956) was a Liberal party member of the House of Commons of Canada. He was born in Greenwich, England and became a barrister.

Butcher moved from the United Kingdom to Canada in 1904. He attended private schools in England, then studied at the University of Manchester from which he received his Bachelor of Laws degree.

From 1920 to 1930, he served as chair of the Punnichy, Saskatchewan school board.

He was elected to Parliament at the Last Mountain riding in the 1930 general election after a previous unsuccessful campaign there in the 1925 federal election. After serving his only House of Commons term, the 17th Canadian Parliament, Butcher left federal politics and did not seek re-election in the 1935 vote.

References

External links
 

1873 births
1956 deaths
Alumni of the University of Manchester
English expatriates in Canada
Liberal Party of Canada MPs
Members of the House of Commons of Canada from Saskatchewan